Francis Joins the WACS is a 1954 American black-and-white comedy film from Universal-International, produced by Ted Richmond, directed by Arthur Lubin and starring Donald O'Connor, Julie Adams, ZaSu Pitts, Mamie Van Doren and Chill Wills in two roles, including that of the distinctive voice of Francis in voice-over.

This is the fifth film in Universal-International's Francis the Talking Mule series.

Plot
A computer error mistakenly assigns junior officer Peter Stirling to the Women's Army Corps. Peter's old friend Francis helps him through his various military and personal problems, including several familiar stays in the base's psychiatric ward.

The film is noteworthy for Chill Wills appearing on screen as General Ben Kaye and interacting with Francis, who talks to him in order to get Peter out of trouble.

Cast
Donald O'Connor as Peter Stirling
Julie Adams as Captain Jane Parker (as Julia Adams)
Mamie Van Doren as Corporal Bunky Hilstrom
Chill Wills as General Benjamin Kaye / voice of Francis
Lynn Bari as Major Louise Simpson
ZaSu Pitts as Lieutenant Valerie Humpert. Pitts played the same character in the first film of the series.
Joan Shawlee as Sergeant Kipp
Allison Hayes as Lieutenant Dickson
Mara Corday as Kate
Karen Kadler as Marge
Elsie Holmes as Bessie

Production
Donald O'Connor's contract with Universal had expired, so there was some doubt that he would reprise his role before he agreed to make another film.

Leonard Goldstein did not return as producer, being replaced by Ted Richmond.

Although Francis Joins the WACS was announced in late 1952, filming did not start until February 1954.

Reception
According to Variety the film outgrossed the second, third and fourth in the Francis series.

Home media
Universal released all seven Francis films as a set on three Region 1 and Region 4 DVDs, Francis the Talking Mule: The Complete Collection.

References

External links

Review of film at Variety

1954 films
1950s fantasy comedy films
American black-and-white films
Films directed by Arthur Lubin
Films scored by Henry Mancini
Films scored by Frank Skinner
Military humor in film
Universal Pictures films
Films about the United States Army
American fantasy comedy films
1954 comedy films
Films about donkeys
1950s English-language films
1950s American films
Women's Army Corps
WACS